"Now We're Getting Somewhere" is a 1986 song by rock group, Crowded House. It was the third single from the group's debut album Crowded House. It is the only single from that album to not appear on any of the band's greatest hits albums; Recurring Dream & The Very Very Best of Crowded House.  It was the first single to feature the song, "Recurring Dream", as a B-Side. "Now We're Getting Somewhere" peaked at No. 63 on the Australian Kent Music Report singles chart, and No. 33 in New Zealand.

Track listing
All songs by Neil Finn. Released as 7" vinyl single in Australia by Capitol (Catalogue CP 1822). "Now we're getting somewhere" is from the album "Crowded House". Recurring dream is the original Version later released on the "Rikki and Pete"-soundtrack and on the 2016 Deluxe edition of the album "Crowded House"
 "Now We're Getting Somewhere" - 4:09
 "Recurring Dream" - 2:59

Charts

Notes

Crowded House songs
1986 singles
Songs written by Neil Finn
Song recordings produced by Mitchell Froom